Shakuntala Rawat is Member of Legislative Assembly of Rajasthan from Bansur, Alwar, Rajasthan, and now The industries ministry has been given to the new entrant Shakuntala Rawat. She is probably the first woman to be the state’s industries minister. She has been given the devasthan and the state enterprises departments too. Shakuntala is a Gujjar from eastern Rajasthan and belongs to the state’s most backward classes (MBC).also Former President of State Women Congress Committee of Rajasthan following with Former General Secretary, All India WOMEN Congress.

References 

1968 births
21st-century Indian politicians
Living people
Indian National Congress politicians from Rajasthan